Robert Mark Gašpar (born 7 February 1981), also known as Robbie Gaspar, is an Australian soccer player who plays for Floreat Athena.

An attacking midfielder, Gaspar is a former player of Malaysian side Sabah FA where he played for two seasons and appeared in the final of the 2003 Malaysia Cup. He spent two years with the youth team of HNK Hajduk Split but failed to make a first team appearance for the Croatian giants.

Robert is a friend of Indonesian boxer Chris John and the late Indonesian metal-music journalist and Persiba Balikpapan supporter John Yoedi. He got to know Yoedi when Yoedi would bring an Australian flag to the stadium to support Robbie.

Honours

Club honors
Perth SC
Football West State League Premier Division (1): 2002

References

External links

Profile in OzFootball

1981 births
Living people
Australian people of Croatian descent
Australian soccer players
Australian expatriate soccer players
Sydney Olympic FC players
Expatriate footballers in Malaysia
Expatriate footballers in Indonesia
Expatriate footballers in Brunei
Sabah F.C. (Malaysia) players
Persiba Balikpapan players
Persema Malang players
Persib Bandung players
Liga 1 (Indonesia) players
Australian expatriate sportspeople in Indonesia
Association football midfielders